Sander Groen (born 16 June 1968) is a professional tennis player from the Netherlands.

Groen enjoyed most of his tennis success while playing doubles.  During his career he won 1 ATP doubles title and 12 Challenger doubles titles.  He achieved a career-high doubles ranking of World No. 61 in 1997 and a career-high singles ranking of World No. 177 in 1996.

Groen is known for being the doubles partner of many top-5 singles players like Pat Cash, Goran Ivanišević, Gustavo Kuerten, Marcelo Ríos, Marat Safin, Magnus Norman, Greg Rusedski, Alex Corretja, Marc Rosset and Roger Federer. Federer won his first-ever professional title on the tour playing together with Groen in Segovia 1999. Groen recorded doubles wins over Federer, Safin, Rios, Patrick Rafter and world number 1 teams Eltingh/ Haarhuis (with Fredrik Bergh), Bhupathi/ Paes (with Jan Siemerink and with Andrei Pavel) and Knowles/ Nestor (with Laurence Tieleman) 
In singles Groen qualified for 9 ATP Tour events reaching the second round in 3 events and he recorded wins over Tim Henman, Richard Krajicek Felix Mantilla and Andrei Chesnokov. He won the dutch national masters in 1992 beating Fernon Wibier in the finals and was runner-up to Jan Siemerink in 1994.

In 2004 Sander Groen made his mark on the ITF senior tour by winning the men's singles over 35 world championships followed by finishing runner-up in 2005 and 2006. He also won the men's singles over 35 European championships in 2005. Up to 2016 Groen won 11 medals at ITF seniors world championships.

Groen is still active on the professional tour, and was ranked 1556 in doubles in February 2017.

Doubles titles (13)

Runners-up (15)

External links

1968 births
Living people
Dutch male tennis players
Tennis players from Amsterdam